Diogo Alberto Carvalho Torres (born 22 April 1987) is a Portuguese football player who plays for Merelinense.

Club career
He made his professional debut in the Segunda Liga for Maia on 17 December 2005 in a game against Portimonense.

References

1987 births
People from Maia, Portugal
Living people
Portuguese footballers
Portuguese expatriate footballers
F.C. Maia players
Liga Portugal 2 players
Gondomar S.C. players
C.D. Tondela players
C.D. Cinfães players
F.C. Tirsense players
F.C. Famalicão players
Merelinense F.C. players
F.C. Felgueiras 1932 players
Lusitânia F.C. players
Portuguese expatriate sportspeople in France
Expatriate footballers in France
Association football forwards
Sportspeople from Porto District